Antipope Paschal III (or Paschal III) was a 12th-century clergyman who, from 1164 to 1168, was the second antipope to challenge the reign of Pope Alexander III. He had previously served as Cardinal of St. Maria.

Biography
Born Guido of Crema; he was a nephew of Cardinal John of Crema. In 1159, he joined the obedience of Victor IV and organized synods in England and France in favour of the antipope. Pope Alexander III interdicted him. In 1164, Victor IV died. A small number of cardinals, who had been obedient to Victor IV, met again in Lucca to elect a successor. Guido was elected as the successor, took the name Paschal III, and was consecrated by Henry II of Leez, Bishop of Liège. The new pope was established at Viterbo and successfully prevented Alexander from reaching Rome. However, he was soon driven from Rome, leading to the return of Alexander III in 1165.

In order to gain more support from Emperor Frederick Barbarossa, Paschal canonized Charlemagne in a magnificent celebration  at Aachen in 1165. Paschal soon lost the support of Burgundy, but the emperor crushed opposition in Germany and gained the cooperation of Henry II of England.

Concerned over rumours that Alexander III was about to enter into an alliance with the Byzantine Emperor ManuelI, in October 1166, Frederick embarked on his fourth Italian campaign, hoping as well to secure the claim of PaschalIII and the imperial coronation of his wife, Beatrice. In 1167, Frederick began besieging Ancona, which had acknowledged the authority of ManuelI. Meanwhile, his forces achieved a great victory over the Romans at the Battle of Monte Porzio. Heartened by this victory, Frederick lifted the siege of Ancona and hurried to Rome. On the following 30 July, Frederick received a second coronation from PaschalIII. Two days later, Paschal crowned Beatrice empress. Unfortunately, Frederick's campaign was halted by the sudden outbreak of an epidemic (malaria or the plague), which threatened to destroy the Imperial army and drove the emperor back to Germany. Without the support of the Emperor, Paschal was able to hold only the quarter on the right bank of the Tiber where he died of cancer . He was succeeded by Antipope Callixtus III.

The Catholic Church has never recognized Charlemagne's canonization as Paschal was an antipope. In 1179, the Third Council of the Lateran annulled all of his ordinances, including the canonization. Charlemagne remained in good regard still, however, among Catholics, and Prosper Guéranger even composed a prayer to Charlemagne. He is a Blessed of the Church. Also annulled was the coronation of Empress Beatrice, who ceased to be referred as empress.

See also
 Papal selection before 1059
 Papal conclave (since 1274)

Note

References

Further reading
  
 
 

12th-century antipopes
12th-century Christian clergy
Paschal 3
Apostolic Envoys to Poland
Date of birth unknown